Vanesa Restrepo (born April 13, 1987) is a Colombian actress and model. She is known for Como dice el dicho, Quiero amarte and Muchacha italiana viene a casarse.

Filmography

Film roles

Television roles

References

External links

1987 births
Colombian female models
Colombian telenovela actresses
Living people
People from Medellín
21st-century Colombian actresses